The Electoral district of Mitcham was an electoral district of the Victorian Legislative Assembly. It was centered on Mitcham and Blackburn in the eastern suburbs of Melbourne.

Created prior to the 1967 election it was, with one exception, always held by the current government. The one exception was a 1997 by-election which was won by the Labor Party with a massive 16% swing, signaling a revival in the performance of the ALP prior to the 1999 election where they narrowly retained the seat and even more narrowly won government.

Mitcham was abolished in 2014 and largely replaced by Ringwood.

Members for Mitcham

Election results

See also
 Parliaments of the Australian states and territories
 List of members of the Victorian Legislative Assembly

External links
 Electorate profile: Mitcham District, Victorian Electoral Commission

Former electoral districts of Victoria (Australia)
1967 establishments in Australia
2014 disestablishments in Australia